This is a list of people from San Marcos, Texas in the United States.

Native residents 

The following people were born in San Marcos. Some became famous after moving away.
 Ty Detmer, Heisman-winning quarterback from Brigham Young University
 Eddie Durham, jazz guitarist and early electric guitar innovator
 Tex Hughson, Boston Red Sox pitcher 1941-49 and father of Jane Hughson, mayor of San Marcos
 Catalina Vasquez Villalpando, 39th Treasurer of the United States
 Tino Villanueva, poet and writer

Residents 

These people are or were well known for living in San Marcos. They are either non-native, or a birthplace has not yet been confirmed.
 Charles Austin, Olympic gold medalist
 Powers Boothe, Emmy Award-winning actor
 Ryan Delahoussaye, popular musician and member of the band Blue October
 Tom Ford, film director and fashion designer
 Jeremy Furstenfeld, popular musician and member of the band Blue October
 Justin Furstenfeld, popular musician and member of the band Blue October
 Aaryn Gries, contestant on Big Brother 15
 Heloise (Poncé Kiah Marchelle Heloise Cruse Evans), writer, author, speaker, and syndicated columnist
 C.B. Hudson, popular musician and member of the band Blue October
 Lyndon B. Johnson, thirty-sixth President of the United States, educated at Texas State University–San Marcos
 Tom Martin, Mayor of Lubbock
 Matt Noveskey, popular musician and member of the band Blue October
 Tomás Rivera, influential figure in Chicano and American literature; Texas State University–San Marcos alumni
 John Sharp, former Texas Comptroller
 George Strait, Grammy Award-winning musician

References 

 8. Eddie Durham Eddie Durham

 9. Kreg Llewellyn 
 
10. Tex Hughson 
    Tex Hughson

San Marcos, Texas
San Marcos